Eduardo Luiz Person  (born 24 January 1997) is a Brazilian professional footballer who plays as a midfielder for Ituano.

Club career
Born in Garuva, Santa Catarina, Person was a Joinville youth graduate. He made his first team debut on 9 February 2017, coming on as a late substitute for Jonathan in a 2–0 away loss against Atlético Mineiro, for the year's Primeira Liga.

In April 2017, Person was loaned to Série D side Metropolitano until the end of the tournament. In July, after the club's elimination from the competition, he moved to Juventus de Jaraguá also in a temporary deal.

Person returned to JEC for the 2018 season, and became a regular starter for the side. In July of that year, however, he suffered a knee injury, only returning in the following March. 

In July 2019, Person was loaned to Brasil de Pelotas in the Série B. He returned to Joinville in December, but moved on loan to fellow second division side Guarani on 6 January 2020.

In October 2020, Person suffered another knee injury, and his loan was renewed for a further year on 27 January 2021. Back to action in August, he signed a permanent deal with Bugre on 23 December 2021.

On 13 December 2022, Person was announced at Ituano also in the second division.

Career statistics

References

1997 births
Living people
Sportspeople from Santa Catarina (state)
Brazilian footballers
Association football midfielders
Campeonato Brasileiro Série B players
Campeonato Brasileiro Série C players
Campeonato Brasileiro Série D players
Joinville Esporte Clube players
Clube Atlético Metropolitano players
Grêmio Esportivo Juventus players
Grêmio Esportivo Brasil players
Guarani FC players
Ituano FC players